In Greek mythology, Mestra (Mēstra) was a daughter of Erysichthon of Thessaly. Antoninus Liberalis called Mestra as Hypermestra while Erysichthon as Aethon.

Family 
Mestra was the mother of King Eurypylus of Cos by Poseidon. According to Ovid, she was married to the thief Autolycus.

Mythology 
Mestra had the ability to change her shape at will, a gift of her lover Poseidon according to Ovid. Erysichthon exploited this gift in order to sate the insatiable hunger with which he had been cursed by Demeter for violating a grove sacred to the goddess. The father would repeatedly sell his daughter to suitors for the bride prices they would pay, only to have the girl return home to her father in the form of various animals. Mestra's great-granduncle Sisyphus also hoped to win her as a bride for his son Glaucus although that marriage did not take place.

Ultimately, Poseidon carried away Mestra to the island of Cos."And earth-shaking Poseidon overpowered herfar from her father, carrying her over the wine-dark seain sea-girt Cos, clever though she was;there she bore Eurypylus, commander of many people."

Notes

References 

 Antoninus Liberalis, The Metamorphoses of Antoninus Liberalis translated by Francis Celoria (Routledge 1992). Online version at the Topos Text Project.
 Apollodorus, The Library with an English Translation by Sir James George Frazer, F.B.A., F.R.S. in 2 Volumes, Cambridge, MA, Harvard University Press; London, William Heinemann Ltd. 1921. ISBN 0-674-99135-4. Online version at the Perseus Digital Library. Greek text available from the same website.
 Callimachus, Callimachus and Lycophron with an English translation by A. W. Mair ; Aratus, with an English translation by G. R. Mair, London: W. Heinemann, New York: G. P. Putnam 1921. Internet Archive
 Callimachus, Works. A.W. Mair. London: William Heinemann; New York: G.P. Putnam's Sons. 1921. Greek text available at the Perseus Digital Library.
 Hesiod, Catalogue of Women from Homeric Hymns, Epic Cycle, Homerica translated by Evelyn-White, H G. Loeb Classical Library Volume 57. London: William Heinemann, 1914. Online version at theio.com
 Publius Ovidius Naso, Metamorphoses translated by Brookes More (1859-1942). Boston, Cornhill Publishing Co. 1922. Online version at the Perseus Digital Library.
 Publius Ovidius Naso, Metamorphoses. Hugo Magnus. Gotha (Germany). Friedr. Andr. Perthes. 1892. Latin text available at the Perseus Digital Library.

Further reading
 .
 .
 .
 .
 .

Family of Canace
Shapeshifters in Greek mythology
Women in Greek mythology
Thessalian characters in Greek mythology
Mythology of Phocis